Sven Sprangler (born 27 March 1995) is an Austrian footballer.

References

1995 births
Living people
Austrian footballers
Association football midfielders
SV Mattersburg players
TSV Hartberg players
Wolfsberger AC players
Austrian Football Bundesliga players
2. Liga (Austria) players